The Sakarya chub (Squalius pursakensis) is a species of ray-finned fish in the family Cyprinidae. It is found in the Sakarya River drainage in Turkey.

References

Squalius
Fish described in 1925